Kurylivka is a village in Kupiansk Raion (district) in Kharkiv Oblast of eastern Ukraine, at about  east-southeast from the centre of Kharkiv city.

On 25 September 2022 an attack on the vehicles, which carried 31 people attempting to flee fighting in Russian-held territory in northeastern Ukraine, was carried out, resulting in seven survivors.

Religion
The Church of St. John the Theologian, probably built in 1625 or late XVIII century, rebuilt in 1836. Destroyed during the retreat of the Russian army in September 2022. Only the bell survived the fire.

References

External links

Villages in Kupiansk Raion